Trần Thanh Mẫn (born 12 August 1962) is a Vietnamese politician who has been First Vice Chairperson of the National Assembly since 1 April 2021.

He is also a member of the Politburo of the Communist Party of Vietnam.

References 

Living people
1962 births
Members of the National Assembly (Vietnam)
21st-century Vietnamese politicians
Members of the 13th Politburo of the Communist Party of Vietnam
Members of the 12th Secretariat of the Communist Party of Vietnam
Alternates of the 10th Central Committee of the Communist Party of Vietnam
Members of the 11th Central Committee of the Communist Party of Vietnam
Members of the 12th Central Committee of the Communist Party of Vietnam
Members of the 13th Central Committee of the Communist Party of Vietnam